Ulick Peter Burke (born August 16, 1937, in Stanmore, England) is a British historian and professor. He was born to a Roman Catholic father and Jewish mother (who later converted to Roman Catholicism).

From 1962 to 1979, he was a member of the School of European Studies at University of Sussex, before moving to the University of Cambridge, where he holds the title of Professor Emeritus of Cultural History and Fellow of Emmanuel College, Cambridge. Burke is celebrated as a historian not only of the early modern era, but one who emphasizes the relevance of social and cultural history to modern issues. He is married to the Brazilian historian Maria Lúcia Garcia Pallares-Burke who is the author of two books (in one of which she collaborated with her husband).

He was educated by the Jesuits and at St John's College, Oxford and was a doctoral candidate at St Antony's College, Oxford.

From 1962 to 1979 he was part of the School of European Studies at the University of Sussex, and then went on to the University of Cambridge, where he is now Professor Emeritus of Cultural History, and a Fellow of Emmanuel College.

Burke is not only known for his work on the Modern Age but also for his research on cultural history across its entire spectrum. As a  polyglot, he has managed on the one hand to incorporate information from a good part of Europe and has also achieved good diffusion of his books. They have been translated into more than thirty languages. In 1998, he was awarded the Erasmus Medal of the European Academy, and is an honorary doctorate from the Universities of Lund, Copenhagen and Bucharest.

Works

Among his most important works are:
 The Italian Renaissance (1972)
 Popular Culture in Early Modern Europe (1978)
 Sociology and History (1980)
 The Renaissance (1987)
 The French Historical Revolution: The Annales School 1929-89 (1990)
 History and Social Theory (1991)
 New Perspectives on Historical Writing (1991) (editor and contributor)
 The Fabrication of Louis XIV (1992)
 The Art of Conversation (1993)
 "The Fortunes of The Courtier: The European Reception of Castiglione's Cortegiano" (1995)
 Varieties of Cultural history (1997)
 The European Renaissance: Centres and Peripheries (1998)
 A Social History of Knowledge (2000)
 Eyewitnessing (2000)
 A Social History of the Media: From Gutenberg to the Internet (2002) (with Asa Briggs)
 What is Cultural History? (2004)
 Languages and Communities in Early Modern Europe (2004)
 Gilberto Freyre: Social Theory in the Tropics (2008) (with Maria Lúcia Garcia Pallares-Burke)
 Cultural Hybridity (2009)
 A Social History of Knowledge Volume II: From the Encyclopedie to Wikipedia (2012)
 What is the History of Knowledge? (2015)
 The Polymath: A Cultural History from Leonardo da Vinci to Susan Sontag (2020)

References

External links
Emmanuel College biography

 interviewed by Alan Macfarlane on 31 July 2004 (video)

1937 births
Living people
British historians
Cultural historians
Alumni of St John's College, Oxford
Academics of the University of Sussex
Fellows of Emmanuel College, Cambridge
Institute for Advanced Study visiting scholars
Historians of the Renaissance